Events from the year 2021 in Saint Kitts and Nevis

Incumbents 

 Monarch: Elizabeth II
 Governor-General: Tapley Seaton
 Prime Minister: Timothy Harris
 Speaker: Anthony Michael Perkins

Events 
Ongoing: COVID-19 pandemic in Saint Kitts and Nevis

 1 January – 2021 New Year Honours
 23 July – 8 August: Saint Kitts and Nevis at the 2020 Summer Olympics
 25 November – 5 December: Saint Kitts and Nevis at the 2021 Junior Pan American Games

References 

 
Years of the 21st century in Saint Kitts and Nevis
Saint Kitts and Nevis
Saint Kitts and Nevis
2020s in Saint Kitts and Nevis